Harry Burns (July 20, 1882 – January 9, 1939) was a vaudeville performer, boxing referee, actor, assistant director, animal-picture director and producer, and Hollywood magazine publisher. Burns was married to the actress Dorothy Vernon; the silent-film slapstick comedy star Bobby Vernon was his stepson.

Biography 
Burns was born Jacob Elman in Warsaw, Poland. He started in vaudeville in New York before 1900 when he captured the attention of audiences as "the world's champion bag puncher." He did nine years of vaudeville, traveling from California to Maine and back again. He was then employed at the Pacific Athletic Club as press agent and secretary to Thomas J. Carey but when 20-round boxing matches were banned in California, he went into the film industry. At the time of his death in 1939, Burns' life story was said to "encompass all the old Hollywoodiana that is gone forever. There's Uncle Tom McCarey's Vernon boxing arena, the 50-round fights that Burns refereed, the funny Jack-in-the-Beanstalk pictures he directed during the war, the rise of Carl Laemmle, the first Hollywood animal pictures..."

Burns worked as a prop master for Charlie Chase, and as a director for William Fox, Chet Franklin, and Hal Roach. He did a long stint as assistant director to William S. Campbell and when Campbell left Universal followed him to Chester Comedies, and then took over the Joe Martin monkey picture franchise for Universal, coproducing with Joe Martin's animal trainer Curley Stecker. He was a columnist for Camera! magazine and publisher and editor of Hollywood Filmograph. Burns frequently editorialized in his trade-paper columns against perceived exploitation of extras and bit players by the Central Casting Bureau. Filmograph under Burns' editorship also "spoke to the community of Hollywood actors...and supported Actors' Equity's attempt to gain a foothold" on the west coast.  

During the filming of Rupert Hughes' 1923 Souls for Sale, Burns rescued one or more damsels from an accidental circus-tent fire. He was trampled by one or more panicked horses in the doing.

Burns married the performer Dorothy Vernon in 1915 and was stepfather to silent-film comedy star Bobby Vernon. Harry Burns and Bobby Vernon both died of heart attacks in 1939. Burns and Dorothy Vernon are buried together at Hollywood Forever Cemetery.

Described as the "kindest soul" (albeit with a "deceptively ferocious exterior"), at the time of his death Harry Burns was credited with having the "biggest heart west of Vine Street." 

Note: This Harry Burns is distinct from character actor and native New Yorker Harry Burns (1887–1948), with whom he is frequently confused.

References

External links 
 
 Harry Burns at ECHO

1882 births
1939 deaths
American film directors
American magazine editors
American actors
Vaudeville performers
Polish emigrants to the United States